Dennis Louis Gentry (born February 10, 1959) is a former professional American football player who was selected by the Chicago Bears in the 4th round of the 1982 NFL Draft. He spent his entire 11-year NFL career with the Bears from 1982 to 1992, and was a part of the Bears team that was victorious in Super Bowl XX versus the New England Patriots. He was also a member of the "Chicago Bears Shufflin' Crew" in the video "The Super Bowl Shuffle," which featured him pantomiming on the bass.

In 2001, he was the running backs coach for the XFL's Chicago Enforcers until the league folded. Later that year he was hired as a BLESTO regional scout for the Detroit Lions until 2011.

Gentry finished his career with 171 receptions for 2,076 yards and seven touchdowns.  He also rushed for 764 yards and five touchdowns.  But his main contribution came as a kick returner, and is currently ranked third in return yardage (4,353) for the Bears. Dennis is also tied for the club's all-time kick returns with 192.  In 1986, he led the NFL with a 28.8-yards-per-return average.

References

1959 births
Living people
American football running backs
American football wide receivers
Baylor Bears football players
Chicago Bears players
Chicago Enforcers coaches
Players of American football from Texas
Sportspeople from Lubbock, Texas